Chantal Curtis (born Chantal Sitruk) was a singer who had a disco hit in 1979 with "Get Another Love". She had some recordings released earlier under a different name. She died in Israel in 1985 having been hit by a bullet that was intended for her boyfriend. During her short career she had worked with Pierre Jaubert and Vladimir Cosma.

Background
Curtis was born in Tunisia.

Career
While walking through the streets of Paris in the 1970s and talking to another woman, she was overheard by producer Pierre Jaubert. Liking the sound of her voice, he asked her if she could sing. Wanting to work, she accepted the offer.

In the June 2, 1979 edition of Cashbox, two of her songs were programmers picks in the "Can't Miss" category. "Hey Taxi Driver" was a pick by Leon Wagner from Madison, and "Get Another Love" was picked by Chuck Parsons of Baltimore. "Get Another Love" was released on Keylock Records and that release was remixed by Glen Blacks. In July 1979, "Get Another Love" spent three weeks in the British charts, peaking at No. 51. It was also a disco hit that month on the Dallas / Houston disco chart at No. 11, just behind the Gibson Brothers' "Cuba" at No. 10.   Also, the July 14 issue of Record World reported it as being on the Discothèque Hit Parade at The Ritz in Houston. The song was later recorded years later by Karla Brown.

Her album was produced by Pierre Jaubert, who also used the Lafayette Afro Rock Band as backing musicians.

Session work
Curtis also did session work, backing other artists on their recordings. Along with Carol Rowley, Maryse Cremieux, and The Zulu Gang, she provided backing vocals for Pasteur Lappe on his album,  Na Real Sekele Fo Ya, which was released on Disques Esperance in 1979. Also that year she provided backing vocals for an album by Kassav', Love And Ka Dance.  She contributed backing vocals to the In Need Of ... album by Beckie Bell which was released on the Trema label in 1980. With Carole Rowley, she also provided vocals for the F.M. Band on their self-titled album which was also released in 1980 on the FM Productions label.

Different aliases
In 1973, a single called "Juste Un Petit Peu De Soleil / Rien N'a Changé" was released under the name Chantal Alexandre. 

In 1977, Chantal recorded an album entitled "Magic Love", released in the US on West End Records. The album contained four songs : "Can't You Feel It" and "Magic Love" on the A-Side, "Hold Me, Squeeze Me" and "Disco Dance" on the B-Side. The album was produced by Pierre Jaubert and Tom Moulton.

"Disco Dance" was a hit in the U.S and was released as a single there, on West End Records.

For the album covers and the television appearances, Sitruk was replaced by a "cover" named Michele, some say it was commercial, the cover being "more attractive". A video of Michelle singing "Magic Love" on French TV channel "Melody Variétés" can be found on YouTube.

In 1978, Curtis recorded an album entitled Don't You Know on the Barclay label.
"Body Party" was released as a single, with "Honey Child" as the B-side.

The same year, Chantal released another single "Un Païs Tropical / Mystic Love" , under the name Julie Sitruk.

Death
Curtis died in Israel in 1985. She fell victim to an assassination attempt on her boyfriend (but not Philippe Briche), and was hit by the bullet that was intended for him.

Discography

Albums

Singles

Appearances

References

External links
 "Get Another Love" live

1985 deaths
20th-century Tunisian  women singers
Deaths by firearm in Israel
French disco singers
French women pop singers
French murder victims
Tunisian murder victims
20th-century French women singers